William McKennan (September 27, 1816 – October 27, 1893) was a United States circuit judge of the United States Circuit Courts for the Third Circuit.

Education and career

Born in Washington, Pennsylvania, McKennan attended Yale University and graduated from Washington College in Washington, Pennsylvania (now Washington & Jefferson College) in 1833, before reading law to enter the bar in 1837. He was in private practice in Washington from 1837 to 1852. He was a deputy state attorney general of Pennsylvania from 1837 to 1839. He was a Burgess of Washington, Pennsylvania in 1847.

Federal judicial service

On December 8, 1869, McKennan was nominated by President Ulysses S. Grant to a new seat on the United States Circuit Courts for the Third Circuit created by 16 Stat. 44. He was confirmed by the United States Senate on December 22, 1869, and received his commission the same day. McKennan served in that capacity until his  retirement from the bench on January 3, 1891.

Death

McKennan died on October 27, 1893, in Pittsburgh, Pennsylvania.

References

Sources
 

1816 births
1893 deaths
19th-century American judges
Judges of the United States circuit courts
United States federal judges appointed by Ulysses S. Grant
Washington & Jefferson College alumni
United States federal judges admitted to the practice of law by reading law
People from Washington, Pennsylvania